"Recollections of a Billiard-marker" ("Записки маркера" ["Zapiski markera"], sometimes translated as "A Billiard-Marker's Notes") is a short story by Leo Tolstoy written and published in 1855, early in Tolstoy's career.  It was translated to English by Nathan Haskell Dole.  George Herbert Perris described the work as containing "scenic and incidental realism."

The story was included in the 1958 Tolstoy's Tales of Courage and Conflict.

See also
 Bibliography of Leo Tolstoy

References

External Links

 Recollections of a Billiard-marker, from RevoltLib.com
 Recollections of a Billiard-marker, from Marxists.org

Short stories by Leo Tolstoy
1855 short stories